Abdul Rahim Chaudhry was a Pakistani and British Raj politician who played a prominent role in the Pakistan Movement۔ He also served as a member of the first Legislative Assembly of Punjab,  and a member of the Provincial Assembly of Punjab.

Early Life 
Chaudhry was born in a Gujjar family, in the town Maingri of British Punjab.

Political career 

Chaudhry was a member of the First Punjab Legislative Assembly from April 5, 1937 to March 19, 1945. He served in the Second Punjab Legislative Assembly from May 7, 1951 to October 14, 1955. Chaudhry also served in the Provincial Assembly of West Pakistan Fifth Assembly from June 9, 1962 to June 8, 1965.

Chaudhry was given the title of Khan Bahadur under the British Rule.

Descendants 
Chaudhry's son Chaudhry Idrees Taj was a member of Majlis-e-Shura in Zia-ul-Haq Cabinet, while his other son Chaudhry Ishfaq Taj remained a member of the National Assembly NA-91 for two terms first from 1990–1993, then 1993-1997

Saqib Idrees Taj, son of Chaudhry Idrees Taj and grandson of Chaudhry Abdul Rahim, is a politician and holds a position in the Central Executive Committee of Pakistan Tehreek-e-Insaf.

References

People from Narowal District
Politicians from Punjab, Pakistan